The 1994 FIFA World Cup final was a soccer game that took place at the Rose Bowl in Pasadena, California, United States, on July 17, 1994, to determine the winner of the 1994 FIFA World Cup. Brazil beat Italy 3–2 on penalties to claim their fourth World Cup title when the game finished 0–0 after extra time; this meant that Brazil surpassed Italy and Germany as the tournament's most successful nation.

It was the first, and to date, only World Cup final to be scoreless both in regular and extra time and to be decided by a penalty shoot-out. Silver Ball winner Roberto Baggio missed the decisive penalty for Italy. Brazil had previously beaten Italy in the 1970 final, marking the 1994 final as the second time that the same teams had met in two different World Cup finals, after Argentina and Germany met in 1986 and 1990. Played at 12:30 local time, this was the most recent World Cup final to be played in a broad daylight.

FIFA awarded the final game of the tournament to the famous college sports stadium near Los Angeles on June 30, 1992; the Rose Bowl was the largest stadium used for the tournament. With over 94,000 spectators, the 1994 Final is the most recent World Cup Final to have an attendance of 90,000 or more as of 2022.

The Brazilian team dedicated their win to the late triple Formula One motor racing world champion Ayrton Senna, who had died in an accident at that year's San Marino Grand Prix in Italy two and a half months before. With Italy finishing as runners-up, Franco Baresi became the sixth player in history to win gold, silver and bronze medals at the FIFA World Cup. Previously this result was attained in 1974 by five German players: Sepp Maier, Franz Beckenbauer, Wolfgang Overath, Jürgen Grabowski and Horst-Dieter Höttges.

Background

The 1994 FIFA World Cup was the 16th edition of the World Cup, FIFA's competition for national teams, held in the United States between June 17 and July 17, 1994. The finals featured 24 teams, with the United States qualifying for the finals automatically as tournament hosts, along with Germany as the 1990 winners. The remaining 22 spots were decided through qualifying rounds held between March 1992 and November 1993, organized by the six FIFA confederations and involving 147 teams. In the final tournament, the twenty-four teams were divided into six groups of four with each team playing each other once within the group in a round-robin format.  The two top teams from each group along with the four best third-placed sides advanced to a knock-out phase.

The game was played at the Rose Bowl, in the city of Pasadena, California, part of the Los Angeles metropolitan area. With a capacity of 102,000, it was the largest of the venues selected for the World Cup and had previously hosted the gold medal match at the 1984 Summer Olympics and five Super Bowls, as well as the annual Rose Bowl Game in college American football. The ball for this game was the Adidas Questra, which was introduced at the start of the World Cup. The ball was lighter than those previously used. Canadian journalist Scott McKeen described it as having been "engineered to created more excitement for soccer, in a land where there has been little soccer excitement". The ball's controllability was praised by strikers in the tournament, but goalkeepers criticized what they said was its unpredictable tendency to deviate in flight.

Brazil had won the title three times before, in 1958, 1962 and 1970, while Italy had also recorded three wins in the 1934, 1938 and 1982 tournaments. The winner would therefore be the first nation to record a fourth World Cup win. The two teams had met four times previously in the World Cup with two wins each – in the semi-final of the 1938 tournament, which Italy won 2–1; the 1970 final, which Brazil won 4–1; the third-place playoff in 1978, won 2–1 by Brazil, and four years later in the group stage, where Italy won the game 3–2.

Brazil began the tournament as favorites, with both pundits and bookmakers regarding them as the most likely team to win. Commentators cited the team's star players such as Raí and Romario, as well as the hot weather conditions, which they said would favor Latin American teams. Italy was also listed before the tournament among the teams likely to win the competition, although some commentators thought they might face difficulties based on poor recent performance and a failure to adapt to manager Arrigo Sacchi's preferred attacking style of play. In the 1990 World Cup, Brazil had been eliminated in the round of 16, losing to Argentina, while Italy finished third in the tournament, on home soil, beating England in the third-place playoff game after losing to Argentina in a penalty shoot-out in the semi-final.

Route to the final

Brazil

Brazil was in Group B at the World Cup, in which they were joined by Cameroon, Russia and Sweden. Their first game was the tournament opener at Stanford Stadium in California, on June 20 against Russia. Brazil opened the scoring on 26 minutes, when Romário evaded his marker following an in-swinging corner and hit the ball into the goal. Brazil scored again on 52 minutes, when Raí converted a penalty following a foul by Vladislav Ternavsky on Romário, and they went on to complete a 2–0 win. Their second game was against Cameroon on June 24, once again at Stanford. Romário gave Brazil the lead on 39 minutes after receiving a pass from Dunga and hitting it past goalkeeper Joseph-Antoine Bell. In the second half, Cameroon defender Rigobert Song was sent off for a foul on Raí, before Márcio Santos and Bebeto added two further goals to complete a 3–0 win for Brazil. The result meant that Brazil had qualified for the round-of-16 with one game to spare. Brazil's final group game was against Sweden at the Pontiac Silverdome in Michigan on June 28. Kennet Andersson gave Sweden the lead on 23 minutes, following a long pass by Tomas Brolin, before Romário equalized for Brazil with his third goal of the tournament shortly after half time. The game finished 1–1, which was sufficient for Brazil to finish as group winners.

Brazil faced the United States in the round of 16, playing the hosts on July 4, their Independence Day. Brazil's performance through most of the game was described by The Guardian Paul Wilson as "wholly unconvincing as aspiring champions", until Bebeto scored the game's only goal on 72 minutes. Both teams finished the game with 10 players after Brazil's Leonardo was dismissed for a violent foul while American Fernando Clavijo was sent off for a second bookable offense. In the quarter-finals, Brazil played the Netherlands at the Cotton Bowl in Dallas on July 9. After a goalless first half, Romário gave Brazil the lead from a Bebeto pass on 53 minutes, before Bebeto himself scored a second ten minutes later. The Dutch players disputed the second goal, saying that Romário had been caught by their offside trap when Branco passed forward to him in the build-up, but the goal stood. Rob Witschge of the Netherlands later said that the linesman was "absolutely blind". The Netherlands pulled a goal back a minute later through Dennis Bergkamp, and then equalized with 14 minutes remaining, through Aron Winter. Brazil's semi-final was against the Sweden at the Rose Bowl in Pasadena, California on July 13. Sweden defended deeply throughout the game and was reduced to 10 players when 	Jonas Thern was sent off in the 63rd minute for a foul on Dunga. Brazil had much of the possession and several chances throughout the game, but they did not score until the 81st minute when Romário headed the ball into the Swedish goal from a Jorginho cross. Brazil won 1–0 and earned a place in the final.

Italy

Italy was drawn in Group E at the finals, alongside Mexico, Norway and the Republic of Ireland. They began their campaign on June 18 against the Republic of Ireland at the Giants Stadium in East Rutherford, New Jersey. Italy was one of the pre-tournament favorites to win the World Cup, but the crowd was predominantly Irish, many of them Irish Americans. Ireland won the game 1–0 through an 11th-minute goal by Ray Houghton, a result later described by The Irish Post as "one of Ireland's greatest ever sporting moments". Italy's second game was against Norway on June 23, once again the Giants Stadium. Goalkeeper Gianluca Pagliuca was sent off after 22 minutes for a professional foul, but Italy recovered to win the game 1–0, Dino Baggio scoring the winner after 69 minutes. Their final group game, against Mexico at the RFK Stadium in Washington, DC, began with all four Group E teams level on points. The Italian supporters were again outnumbered by the opposition, but their team took the lead shortly after half-time through a low shot by Daniele Massaro. Massaro almost added a second on 56 minutes, but then Mexico equalized a minute later through Marcelino Bernal. The game finished 1–1, while Norway and the Republic of Ireland also drew, leaving all four teams on 4 points with identical goal difference. With the most goals scored, Mexico was 1st in the group, while Norway was bottom with fewest goals. Italy and the Republic of Ireland both had two goals each, but Ireland took second place through their win over Italy. Italy qualified for the next round, however, as one of the better-performing third-place teams, with their progress confirmed when Cameroon was defeated by Russia later that day.

Italy's round-of-16 opponent was Nigeria, at the Foxboro Stadium in Foxborough, Massachusetts, on July 5. Nigeria took the lead on 25 minutes, when Finidi George took a corner which bounced off Italian defender Paolo Maldini before being struck into the goal by Emmanuel Amunike. On 75 minutes, Italy's Gianfranco Zola, who had come on as a substitute, was sent off for a foul on Augustine Eguavoen, immediately after he had been denied a penalty. Despite this setback, Italy equalized on 88 minutes when Roberto Baggio hit a low shot past the Nigerian goalkeeper. With the score at 1–1, the game went to extra time and the game was decided when Roberto Baggio scored his second goal on 102 minutes, sealing a 2–1 Italian win. Their quarter-final game was against Spain in Foxborough on July 9. Dino Baggio gave Italy the lead on 25 minutes, before Spain's José Luis Caminero equalized shortly before the hour mark. For the second game in a row, Roberto Baggio scored on 88 minutes, scoring from a tight angle following a run into the penalty area and Italy won 2–1. They returned to the Giants Stadium on July 13 for a semi-final against Bulgaria. Bulgaria had defeated previous champions Argentina and Germany en route to the match, but Italy started strongly, Roberto Baggio scoring twice in the first half hour to give them a 2–0 lead. Bulgaria's Hristo Stoichkov pulled a goal back through a penalty shortly before half time, and protested about two denied penalty claims in the second half, but Italy held on for a 2–1 win and place in the grand final.

Match

Summary

Brazil's Mazinho was booked in the fourth minute for a foul on Nicola Berti. In the 13th minute, Romario had a chance to score with a header from close range, following a cross by Dunga, but his header went straight to the goalkeeper. Four minutes later, Romario passed the ball through to Bebeto on the left side of the penalty area. Instead of shooting, Bebeto attempted a cross but it deflected behind off Paolo Maldini. Italy then had one of their best chances of the game when Daniele Massaro beat two defenders and was one-on-one with Taffarel, but his shot was directed straight at the Brazilian goalkeeper. On 21 minutes, Brazil's Jorginho had to be leave the game following an injury sustained a few minutes previously and was replaced by Cafu. Italy made a replacement on 34 minutes, bringing Luigi Apolloni on for Roberto Mussi, moving Maldini to the left-back position. Roberto Baggio attempted a pass through to Antonio Benarrivo late in the first half but Aldair was able to intercept it. Late in the half, Brazil had two further opportunities, first from Romario, whose shot was parried by Gianluca Pagliuca without falling to a Brazilian player, and then through Branco whose free kick was saved. The free kick resulted from a foul by Apolloni on Romario, for which Apolloni received yellow card, while Italian defender Demetrio Albertini was also booked for not being sufficiently far from the ball during the free kick. The first half concluded with the score at 0–0.

In the second half, Cafu hit a shot that went across the face of the Italian goal, after which Bebeto attempted to score with a header which was saved by Pagliuca and was also flagged for offside. Roberto Baggio had a chance for Italy, when he received a pass from Dino Baggio and was able to run at the Brazilian goal, but Marcio Santos tackled him and kicked the ball out, ending his run. Silva attended a top-spin shot from distance which bounced off the goalpost, after which Mazinho also had a chance but Pagliuca was able to stop the ball. Other than that, the second half was largely devoid of scoring chances, as Brazil was unable to break through the center-back pairing of Franco Baresi and Paolo Maldini. The lack of attacking play in the game was down to strong holding midfield play by Dino Baggio for Italy, and by both Dunga and Mauro Silva for Brazil.

As extra time began, chances would become more plentiful, as Brazil began to dominate play. Romário had another chance early in extra time after Pagliuca made an ill-advised decision to come for a cross, leaving the goal exposed, but Bebeto was unable to find him. Roberto Baggio, who had been quiet for most of the game having picked up an injury earlier in the tournament, had his only sight of goal in the entire game in the first half of extra time, hitting a shot from around 25 yards, but Taffarel pushed the shot over. Zinho had a chance on the stroke of halftime in extra time, hitting his shot well from inside the area, but Pagliuca saved well at his near post. In the second half of extra time, Romário missed a golden chance to hand Brazil the trophy, as Cafu had found him inside the six yard box. With Pagliuca at least four yards away from him on the other side of the goal, and the entire goal to aim at, the off balance Romário put his shot wide of the post.

This was the first time the World Cup would be decided on penalties. Italian captain Baresi took the first penalty and blazed his penalty over the bar. Brazilian center-back Márcio Santos went next, but Pagliuca saved the Brazilian defender's effort low to his right. Demetrio Albertini went next for Italy, scoring his penalty into the top corner. Romário was next for Brazil, and he scored his penalty, placing it so far in the corner that it went in off the post, tying the score at 1–1. Alberico Evani went third for Italy, he scored, putting his penalty high and in the middle, as Taffarel dove to the right. Branco went next for Brazil, and he scored in the bottom left corner. Massaro, who had scored twice in the Champions League Final less than two months previously, went next for Italy, but he was unable to put the ball in Taffarel's net just as he had been unable to do in the game, as the Brazilian keeper saved to his left. Brazilian captain Dunga was next, and he comfortably placed his shot into the bottom left corner, making it game point. With Italy needing to score to keep their dreams alive, talisman Roberto Baggio stepped up to take the penalty. In what would become an infamous moment in World Cup History, Baggio blazed his penalty over the bar, in similar fashion to Baresi, and this gave Brazil their fourth title.

Details

Post-match

U.S. Vice President Al Gore, UEFA president Lennart Johansson and FIFA president João Havelange were among those present at the stands during the awards ceremony. In the presentation ceremony, Gore handed the trophy to Brazil's captain, Dunga.

See also
Brazil–Italy football rivalry
1970 FIFA World Cup final – the previous Final contested between Brazil and Italy
1999 FIFA Women's World Cup Final – game that was also held at the Rose Bowl and decided by penalty shootout after neither finalist scored

References

1994
1994
1994
1
Final
Fifa World Cup Final 1994
Brazil–Italy relations
Final
Sports competitions in Pasadena, California
International sports competitions in California
FIFA World Cup final
20th century in Pasadena, California
FIFA World Cup final